The Lama dwarf hamster (Cricetulus lama) is a species of rodent in the family Cricetidae. It is found only in the mountains of western China where it inhabits grassland, shrubby marshes and steppes. Although it has a limited range, the International Union for Conservation of Nature has assessed its conservation status as being of "least concern".

Description
It is very similar in appearance to the Chinese striped hamster (Cricetulus barabensis), but is rather smaller, has a shorter tail and lacks the blackish markings on the dorsal fur and upper thighs that that species often has. The dorsal fur is dark greyish-brown, the underparts are greyish white and there is a sharp dividing line where the two colours meet. The tail is thick and well-covered with guard hairs, having a dark stripe at the top and otherwise being white, with a wholly white tip.

Distribution and habitat
The Lama dwarf hamster is endemic to western China where it is found in the Tibet Autonomous Region. It is a mountain species and is found at high altitudes. Its typical habitat is upland grasslands, shrubby marshes and open steppe.

Behaviour
The behaviour of the Lama dwarf hamster has been little studied but it is believed to be similar to that of the Chinese striped hamster, in fact some authorities consider the Lama dwarf hamster to be a subspecies of C. barabensis. It lives in a burrow, ventures out to forage for seeds, carries some back to the burrow to store in specially constructed chambers and breeds in the summer.

Status
The Lama dwarf hamster has a limited range but is presumed to have a large total population. The population trend is unknown, but no particular threats have been identified and it may be present in some protected areas. The International Union for Conservation of Nature has therefore assessed the hamster's conservation status as being of "least concern".

References

Cricetulus
Endemic fauna of China
Rodents of China
Mammals described in 1905